Hempnall is a village and civil parish in the English county of Norfolk.
For the purposes of local government, it falls within the district of South Norfolk.

The villages name means 'Hemma's nook of land'.

Hempnall lies on the B1527 road, with neighbouring villages including Tasburgh and Saxlingham Nethergate.

Facilities in Hempnall include a village hall, playing field, a primary school, and a convenience store run by RS McColl. 'The Hempnall Trust', a village charity, runs The Hempnall Mill Centre at the site of Hempnall Mill.

Governance
An electoral ward in the same name exists. This ward stretches east also south to Shelton and Hardwick with a total population at the 2011 population of 2,560.

Recreation
Hempnall is home to a popular Tennis Club. In the heart of South Norfolk, the club boasts 2 quality floodlit hard courts that can be hired all year round to the public and club members. Their website can be reached here

Notable people
 Anna Hinderer, missionary, was born here in 1827. Hinderer has a small stained glass window devoted to her in the Lady Chapel of Liverpool Cathedral.

According to John Wesley’s journal, on 4th September 1759 he walked the nine miles from Norwich to preach in Hempnall market place. He described how he was followed by a mob from Norwich, who may have been financed by the city’s brewers, and the mob’s ringleader tried to disrupt the proceedings with a horn. This was quickly thrown away by one of the crowd, and the others were soon deeply attentive to John Wesley’s message:
“By grace ye are saved through faith”.

Notes 

http://kepn.nottingham.ac.uk/map/place/Norfolk/Hempnall

External links

 Parish Council website

Villages in Norfolk
Civil parishes in Norfolk
South Norfolk